Qanbari may refer to: 
 Qanbari, Bushehr
 qanbari, kermanshah
 Qanbari, Fars
 Qanbari, Kerman
 Qanbari, Khuzestan